Dual specificity tyrosine-phosphorylation-regulated kinase 2 is an enzyme, in particular a dual-specificity kinase, that in humans is encoded by the DYRK2 gene.

DYRK2 belongs to a family of protein kinases whose members are presumed to be involved in cellular growth and development.  The family is defined by structural similarity of their kinase domains and their capability to autophosphorylate on tyrosine residues.  DYRK2 has demonstrated tyrosine autophosphorylation and catalyzed phosphorylation of histones H3 and H2B in vitro.  Two isoforms of DYRK2 have been isolated.  The predominant isoform, isoform 1, lacks a 5' terminal insert.

See also
DYRK1A

References

Further reading

EC 2.7.12